The 1928–29 Sheffield Shield season was the 33rd season of the Sheffield Shield, the domestic first-class cricket competition of Australia. New South Wales won the championship.

Points system
5 points for a win (changed from 4 points)
3 points for a win on first innings
1 point for a loss on first innings

Table

Statistics

Most Runs
Don Bradman 893

Most Wickets
Tim Wall 29

References

Sheffield Shield
Sheffield Shield
Sheffield Shield seasons